Shuping's Mill Complex was a historic grist mill complex located near Faith, Rowan County, North Carolina.  The complex included a two-story frame dwelling, flour and corn mill building, cotton gin house (1895), and two other contributing buildings.  The mill was built in 1900, and was a 2 1/2-story frame building sheathed n weatherboard and on a stone foundation.  It was destroyed in 1986 when a car crash sparked a fire. The original boiler still remains on the property.

It was listed on the National Register of Historic Places in 1982.

References

Grinding mills in North Carolina
Grinding mills on the National Register of Historic Places in North Carolina
Industrial buildings completed in 1895
Buildings and structures in Rowan County, North Carolina
National Register of Historic Places in Rowan County, North Carolina